Gustáv Hraška (born 5 January 1953) is a Slovak former basketball player. He was voted to the Czechoslovakian 20th Century Team in 2001.

Career
During his club career, Hraška won four Czechoslovakian League championships, in the years 1972, 1974, 1981, and 1982.

With the senior Czechoslovakian national team, Hraška competed in the men's tournament at the 1976 Summer Olympics and the 1980 Summer Olympics. With Czechoslovakia, he also won the bronze medal at the 1977 EuroBasket, and the bronze medal at the 1981 EuroBasket.

See also
Czechoslovak Basketball League career stats leaders

References

External links
FIBA profile

1953 births
Living people
Basketball players at the 1976 Summer Olympics
Basketball players at the 1980 Summer Olympics
Olympic basketball players of Czechoslovakia
Point guards
Czechoslovak men's basketball players
Sportspeople from Poprad
1974 FIBA World Championship players
1978 FIBA World Championship players
1982 FIBA World Championship players
Slovak men's basketball players